The Red Queen is a 2010 historical novel by Philippa Gregory, the second of her series The Cousins' War. It is the story of Margaret Beaufort, mother of Henry VII of England. The 2013 BBC One television series The White Queen is a 10-part adaptation of Gregory's novels The White Queen (2009), The Red Queen and The Kingmaker's Daughter (2012), and features Amanda Hale as Margaret Beaufort.

Critical reception 
Publishers Weekly noted of The Red Queen that "Gregory puts her many imitators to shame by dint of unequalled energy, focus, and unwavering execution."

AudioFile magazine gave its Earphones Award to the audiobook recording of the novel, calling Gregory "the queen of British historical fiction" and praising narrator Bianca Amato's performance as "regal and riveting".

Adaptations 

 The White Queen (2013), drama directed by Colin Teague, James Kent and Jamie Payne, based on novels The White Queen, The Red Queen and The Kingmaker's Daughter

References

External links 
 
 
 

2010 British novels
Historical novels
British novels adapted into television shows
Cultural depictions of English monarchs
Richard III of England
Novels by Philippa Gregory
Novels set in the 15th century
Wars of the Roses in fiction
Works about women in war
Simon & Schuster books